Roberto Gomez (born October 5, 1978) is a professional pocket billiards player from Zamboanga City, Philippines. Known for 9-ball, he competed in the final of both the 2007 WPA World Nine-ball Championships, and the 2007 World Cup of Pool. Gomez was the first qualifier to reach the final of the WPA World Nine-ball Championships.

Career

Early life
Gomez first played pool at 9 years of age. As a passionate admirer of Efren Reyes, he would often record on tape televised matches of the world champion. Although he had aspirations of competing in professional tournaments, Gomez decided to find other careers in college.

He spent college at Western Mindanao State University and initially try to find a course in architecture. But because broadcasting and political science were the only available, Gomez settled for broadcasting. Through this, he became and served as a reporter for ABS-CBN for a couple of years.

Gomez then returned to pool and began playing professionally.

2007 World Nine-ball Championship
Gomez reached the finals of the 2007 WPA World Nine-ball Championship where he took on Daryl Peach of Great Britain. Despite the match being even, Peach won the match 17–15. Though beaten, Gomez became the first qualifier to reach finals of the tournament.

2010 World Cup of Pool
Roberto Gomez and Dennis Orcollo represented Team Philippines in the 2010 World Cup of Pool and played their way to the finals. There, they met Team China formed by Fu Jian-bo and Li He-wen, who won the 2007 edition of the event. In a rather lopsided final, the Chinese team led 9–1 in the race-to-10 match. Though Gomez and Orcollo would win the next four racks to make it 9–5, Team China got another opportunity to take 15th rack and win the event for the second time.

Titles
 2023 Bayou State Classic One Pocket 
 2023 Music City Classic
 2022 Action Palace High Stakes One Pocket
 2022 Texas Open One Pocket Championship
 2022 Diveney Cues Bar Box Classic 10-Ball
 2022 Diveney Cues Bar Box Classic 8-Ball
 2021 International Open One Pocket 
 2021 Midwest Open One Pocket Championship 
 2021 Diamond Open 10-Ball 
 2020 Texas Open One Pocket Championship
 2018 Derby City Classic Bigfoot 10-Ball Challenge
 2017 Chinook Winds Open 8-Ball
 2016 Four Bears Classic 8-Ball  
 2016 Arkansas Open 9-Ball Championship 
 2009 Villar Cup Isabela Leg
 2008 Villar Cup Davao Leg

References

1978 births
Living people
Filipino pool players
Cue sports players at the 2010 Asian Games
Sportspeople from Zamboanga City
Asian Games competitors for the Philippines